The XXIII (23rd) Reims Grand Prix (also known as the II Grand Prix de Reims), was a non-championship Formula One motor race, held on July 14, 1957, at the Reims-Gueux circuit, near Reims in France. The race was run over 61 laps on an 8.302 km circuit of public roads and was won by Italian driver Luigi Musso in a Lancia-Ferrari D50. The race weekend suffered the deaths of Bill Whitehouse and Herbert MacKay-Fraser in separate accidents during the 1st Coupe de Vitesse Formula 2 support race.

The Grand Prix de Reims (commonly known as the Reims Grand Prix) has its roots in the pre WW2 Grand Prix de la Marne GP racing series, also known as the Marne Grand Prix (1925-1937). The first "Grand Prix de Reims" (official name: XVI Grand Prix de Reims) was the first major Grand Prix motor race held at Reims-Gueux after WW2. Post war political and financial re-organization moved the nationally sanctioned Grand Prix de France (Grand Prix de l'ACF) to the circuit Rouen les Essarts and renamed the old Marne GP to Grand Prix de Reims, officially billed as the XVI Grand Prix de Reims (based on the GP de Marne year sequence).

Results

References

External links 
 JM Fangio - 1957 Francia,. XXIII Grand Prix de Reims
 Vanwall's breakthrough win
 Après le GRAND PRIX de l’ACF 1957 REIMS (French language)
 Italy's Maserati privateer
 Drivers: Harry Schell

Reims
Reims Grand Prix